Calvin M. Woodward High School is a public high school located in the north side of Toledo, Ohio, that was built in 1928.  It was named after an early advocate for vocational education.  The original Woodward Technical High School was located in the former Central High School building at the corner of Adams and Michigan streets (the current site of the Lucas County Main Library) before the present location was chosen.  Woodward is part of the Toledo City School District.

The Woodward Polar Bears wear blue and white for athletics and either chose their nickname because they are located in the north end of Toledo, or because former principal Charles LaRue named them after his alma mater at Ohio Northern University.  Woodward is a charter member of the Toledo City League from 1926.  From 1923-1932, Woodward played Libbey High School in a football game on Thanksgiving Day until Libbey and DeVilbiss High School became the annual matchup. In April 1937, the High School displayed a Tesla Coil formerly owned by Nikola Tesla to the public, which they had acquired for educational purposes.

In 2010, the building that Woodward's neighborhood had called home since 1928 was replaced by a newer facility located on the same property.

The TPS board approved a resolution in November 2013 to have new stadiums built at Woodward and Scott High School after their previous facilities were torn down during  construction and renovation.  They were built in time for the 2014 season.  Woodward's previous stadium had been dedicated in 1969 after they had gone without one since the 1930s.

Mr. Jack Renz is the current principal.

Ohio High School Athletic Association State Championships
 Girls Basketball - 1976

Toledo City League Titles

Football: 1952*, 1975*, 1991*, 2019
Volleyball:
Golf:
Boys Basketball: 1927-28, 1929–30, 1939-40*, 1941-42*, 1943-44*, 1944–45, 1946–47, 1952-53*, 1959-60*, 1963–64
Girls Basketball: 1975-76
Wrestling:
Baseball:
Boys Track and Field:
Girls Track and Field: 1970
Softball:
 – (years marked with an asterisk (*) denote a shared title)

Notable alumni

 Philip Baker Hall, actor
 Marvin Crenshaw, All-American football player
 Dick Drago (1963), relief pitcher in Major League Baseball
 Jamie Farr, actor
 Andrew J. Fenady, screenwriter, novelist and film producer
 Bob Harrison, professional basketball player
 Bill Jones (basketball, born 1914), former National Basketball League (United States) basketball player, pioneer in integrating professional American sports
 Howie Komives (1960), NCAA scoring champion at Bowling Green, played for New York Knicks and Detroit Pistons
 Bill Laskey (1975), MLB baseball pitcher with the Giants, Expos, and Indians
 Tom Marsh, former MLB baseball player with Philadelphia Phillies
 Aaron Novick (1937), molecular biologist
 Walt Piatkowski (1964), basketball player at Bowling Green and in the American Basketball Association, father of Eric Piatkowski
 Bryan Robinson (1993), defensive lineman for the Arizona Cardinals
 Paul Seymour, NBA player and coach
 Gloria Ann Taylor, R&B, soul and gospel singer, 1970 Grammy nominee 
 Danny Thomas, actor, comedian and nightclub singer

References

External links 
 

High schools in Toledo, Ohio
Public high schools in Ohio